Raszów may refer to the following places in Poland:
Raszów, Kamienna Góra County in Gmina Kamienna Góra, Kamienna Góra County in Lower Silesian Voivodeship (SW Poland)
Raszów, Trzebnica County in Gmina Trzebnica, Trzebnica County in Lower Silesian Voivodeship (SW Poland)